Guðrúnarkviða III, The Third Lay of Gudrun, is a short Old Norse poem that is part of the Poetic Edda. It has not left any traces in Völsunga saga and was probably not known by its compilers.

It is dated to the early 11th century, because that was the time when the ordeal by boiling water made its appearance in Scandinavia and the poet speaks of it as a practice of foreign origin. According to Henry Adams Bellows, the poem is based on material that came from northern Germany, where the ordeal by boiling water had long been current. He adds that it has so little local colour that it was probably composed based on a story that the poet had heard from a German.

The Guðrún lays show that the hard-boiled heroic poetry of the Poetic Edda also had a place for the hardships of women.

Synopsis
Herkja, one of Atli's former concubines, was serving as a maid at his court. She reported to Atli that she had seen Guðrún together with King Þjóðrekr, which made Atli very angry. He approached Guðrún and she asked him what was the matter.

Guðrún answered that she was innocent and could swear on the sacred white stone that she had not been with Þjóðrekr in that way. She had only talked with Þjóðrekr about their sorrows in secret. Þjóðrekr had arrived with thirty warriors and he had lost all of them, while Atli, her husband, had murdered all her brothers and all the men of her people. Gunnarr could no longer come, and she could no longer greet Högni. She had lost both her beloved brothers and she would like to avenge Högni with her sword. She declared that she wanted payment for her sorrows and she suggested the ordeal of boiling water, for which Atli should summon Saxi, the king of the Southrons, who could hallow the kettle. Then, the poem passes to the execution of the ordeal and what happened to Herkja:

Notes

References
 The Third Lay of Guthrun, Henry Adams Bellows' translation and commentary
 The Third Lay of Gudrún, Benjamin Thorpe's translation
 The Third Lay of Guthrún, Lee M. Hollander's translation
 Guðrúnarkviða hin þriðja Sophus Bugge's edition of the manuscript text
 Guðrúnarkviða in þriðja, Guðni Jónsson's edition with normalised spelling

11th-century poems
Eddic poetry
Sources of Norse mythology
Nibelung tradition
Völsung cycle